28 Days is the debut studio album by Australian punk rock group 28 Days and was released in 1998.

Track listing

Credits
Jay Dunne - vocals 
Scott Pritchard - vocals
Matt Tanner - vocals
Simon Hepburn - guitar
Damian Gardiner  - bass
Adam Nanscawen - drums
Matt Tanner - samples and turn tables

Release history

References

28 Days (band) albums
1998 debut albums
Self-released albums